Vitaly Alekseyevich Fokin (Виталий Алексеевич Фо́кин) (17 March 1906 – 23 January 1964) was a Soviet admiral and the first deputy commander of the Soviet Navy.

Naval career
A worker's son, Vitaliy Alekseyevich Fokin joined the Soviet Navy when he was 16 in 1922. He served as a deck officer aboard the cruiser  from 1927 and commanded the destroyer Uritskiy from 1941 to 1944. In 1944, the squadron that he commanded took part in the capture of the German base in Kirkenes, Norway.

He was appointed chief of staff of the Northern Fleet in 1947, rising up the ranks to become commander of the Pacific Fleet in 1958 and then first deputy commander of the Soviet Navy between 1962 and 1964. Admiral Fokin was a moderniser and was instrumental to the development of the Soviet submarine launched ballistic missile deterrent. In the run up to the Cuban Missile Crisis, he said to his submarine commanders, "If they slap you on the left cheek, do not let them slap you on the right one."

Ranks
 Rear Admiral (25 September 1944)
 Vice-Admiral (11 May 1949)
 Admiral (3 August 1953)

Political career
Admiral Fokin was made a member of the Central Committee of the Communist Party of the Soviet Union in 1961 and a deputy in the Supreme Soviet of the Soviet Union in 1962.

Honours, awards and decorations
  Order of Lenin (1948)
  Order of the Red Banner (four times 1942, 1943, 1944, 1952)
  Order of Nakhimov First degree (1945)
  Order of Ushakov Second degree (1944)
  Order of the Red Star (1935)

See also
The following have been named after Admiral Fokin:
 
 Fokino, Primorsky Krai, home to the Russian Pacific Fleet
 Admiral Fokin Street in Vladivostok

References

1906 births
1964 deaths
Burials at Novodevichy Cemetery
Recipients of the Order of Lenin
Recipients of the Order of the Red Banner
Recipients of the Order of Ushakov, 2nd class
Soviet admirals
Soviet military personnel of World War II